Legal forms of gambling in the U.S. state of New Hampshire include the New Hampshire Lottery, sports betting, parimutuel wagering, and charitable gaming. The state's Gaming Regulatory Oversight Authority (GROA) is part of the New Hampshire Lottery Commission, which also maintains an Investigative & Compliance Division.

Lottery

Initially known as the New Hampshire Sweepstakes, the state's lottery began operation in 1964 and is the oldest lottery conducted by a U.S. state. New Hampshire offers scratch tickets and participates in multi-state lotteries such as Mega Millions and Powerball. Online sales began in September 2018.

Sports betting
Sports betting was legalized by the state in 2019; bets can be placed over the Internet, via mobile app, or at one of a limited number of facilities that have sports betting terminals. The first bet was placed on December 30, 2019, by Chris Sununu, the Governor of New Hampshire.

Parimutuel wagering

The state allows parimutuel wagering on horse racing and greyhound racing. However, there are currently no active tracks in the state.

Rockingham Park, a horse racing facility in Salem, operated from 1906 until 2009. Dog racing took place at several venues, including Hinsdale Greyhound Park, which closed in 2008, and Seabrook Greyhound Park, which ended live racing in 2009 while continuing to offer simulcast wagering of races at other locations.

Charitable gaming
Charitable gaming allowed in the state includes poker, bingo, Lucky 7 pull-tab tickets, and raffles. Groups wishing to run charitable gaming events must be registered with the state.

In 2021, New Hampshire legalized Instant Racing (also known as historical horse racing) at charitable gaming facilities.

Casinos
New Hampshire has no commercial casinos. Several facilities that brand themselves as casinos operate under the state's charitable gaming laws, donating a portion of daily proceeds to local nonprofit organizations. One such facility operates table games including Spanish 21 and roulette, poker tables, and historical horse racing machines. A similar facility donated over $4 million in 10 years to a local American Legion post.

No casino cruise ships currently operate from New Hampshire ports. New Hampshire has the shortest coastline—approximately —of any U.S. state that borders an ocean. Gambling boats have operated at times out of harbors in neighboring Massachusetts, conducting  "cruises to nowhere" in federal waters, where state gambling laws do not apply. 

As New Hampshire has no federally recognized tribes, the state has no Native American gaming (colloquially known as "Indian casinos").

See also
 
 Gambling in the United States
 List of casinos in the United States

Notes

References

External links
 Administrative and Game Rules at NHlottery.com

New Hampshire
New Hampshire
New Hampshire law